Pancratium maximum is a perennial glabrous herb that grows up to 30 cm tall arising from a bulb.  It is endemic to south western Arabia.

Characteristics
Pancratium maximum is a perennial glabrous herb up to 20 cm tall arising from a bulb.  The bulb is globose, 4–6 cm in diameter, narrowed above into a cylindrical neck, covered with several layers of dark reddish brown papery tunics.  Leaves 2–7 cm long, variable in width, linear-elliptic to narrowly elliptic or ovate and abruptly narrowed into a petiole below, 10–30 cm long x 2.3–18 cm across.  The flower is white with yellow anthers and black angular seeds.

Habitat
Pancratium maximum flowers during the monsoon rains.  It grows throughout the areas in Dhofar affected by the monsoon and can be seen in a variety of different environments including coastal plains, wooded mountain slopes, grasslands and high plateaus at the back of mountains..

Uses
Pancratium maximum is completely useless as fodder for livestock.  The bulb and the leaves are toxic to all livestock.

References

maximum